Edward Monahan was an Irish Fine Gael politician. He was a member of Seanad Éireann from 1943 to 1944. He was elected to the 4th Seanad in 1943 by the Administrative Panel. He lost his seat at the 1944 Seanad election. He stood unsuccessfully for Dáil Éireann as a Fine Gael candidate for the Clare constituency at the 1945 by-election and the 1948 general election.

References

Year of birth missing
Year of death missing
Fine Gael senators
Irish solicitors
Members of the 4th Seanad
People from County Clare